Tomáš Hasilla (born 23 August 1990) is a Slovak biathlete.  He competed at the 2014 Winter Olympics in Sochi, in sprint and individual.

Biathlon results
All results are sourced from the International Biathlon Union.

World Championships
0 medals

*During Olympic seasons competitions are only held for those events not included in the Olympic program.
**The single mixed relay was added as an event in 2019.

External links
Tomas Hasilla at IBU

References

1990 births
Living people
Biathletes at the 2014 Winter Olympics
Biathletes at the 2018 Winter Olympics
Olympic biathletes of Slovakia
Sportspeople from Brezno
Slovak male biathletes